Thomas Jerome Foy (28 October 1910 -  27 October 1985) was an Irish footballer.

He played for Shamrock Rovers in the 1930s and in his time at Glenmalure Park scored a total of 29 league goals.

He won three caps for Ireland making his debut on the 7 November 1937, in a 3–3 draw against Norway in a World Cup qualifier at Dalymount Park. His second cap came in a friendly against Hungary on the 19 March 1939, at the Mardyke.

Honours

Shamrock Rovers
League of Ireland: 2
1937–38, 1938–39
League of Ireland Shield: 1
1937-38
Leinster Senior Cup: 1
1938

References

Sources 
 The Hoops by Paul Doolan and Robert Goggins

External links
 

Association footballers from County Dublin
Republic of Ireland association footballers
Ireland (FAI) international footballers
Shamrock Rovers F.C. players
League of Ireland players
1910 births
1985 deaths
Association football forwards